The 2015 Swedish Golf Tour, titled as the 2015 Nordea Tour for sponsorship reasons, was the 32nd season of the Swedish Golf Tour.

Most of the tournaments also featured on the 2015 Nordic Golf League.

Schedule
The following table lists official events during the 2015 season.

Order of Merit
The Order of Merit was titled as the Nordea Tour Ranking and was based on prize money won during the season, calculated using a points-based system.

See also
2015 Danish Golf Tour
2015 Swedish Golf Tour (women)

Notes

References

Swedish Golf Tour
Swedish Golf Tour